Arunagirinagar is a village administrative division in Trincomalee Town and Gravets in Trincomalee, Sri Lanka. As of 2005 Arunagirinagar consists of 575 families with 2,573 members.

Villages in Trincomalee District
Trincomalee Town and Gravets DS Division